Princess Charming is an operetta by composer Albert Szirmai.  It was first presented in Hungarian in Budapest as Alexandra.  The English libretto by Arthur Wimperis and Lauri Wylie is based on the Hungarian libretto by Franz Martos.  The story concerns a young princess who accepts a proposal of marriage from the elderly king of a neighboring country as protection against an uprising by her own subjects. Captain Torrelli, a military officer sent by the king, fears imminent danger to the princess and marries her himself.  The officer then escorts her to his king for an annulment, but the couple fall in love and elope.

The operetta premiered in London in 1926 and was revived on Broadway and elsewhere.  A 1934 film adaptation was made, starring Evelyn Laye and Henry Wilcoxon.

Productions
The operetta premiered on London's West End on 21 October 1926.  It ran for a very successful 362 performances at the Palace Theatre.  The production starred Winnie Melville as Princess Elaine of Novia, John Clarke as Captain Torrelli, W. H. Berry as Albert Chuff, Alice Delysia as Countess Wanda Navaro and George Grossmith, Jr. as King Christian II of Sylvania.  It was produced by Robert Courtneidge.  The production then toured in Britain.

After a rewrite of the book by Jack Donahue, with additional lyrics by producer Arthur Swanstrom and additional music by Arthur Schwartz, the work was presented on Broadway at the Imperial Theatre on October 13, 1930, closing after 56 performances on November 29, 1930.  The production starred Jeanne Aubert as Wanda Navarro, Grossmith as King Christian II of Elyria, and Victor Moore as Irving Huff.  Two up-and-coming entertainers were in smaller roles, Howard St. John as the king's aid and Ernest McChesney as the second footman.

The show was also produced by the J. C. Williamson company in Australia.  It was adapted as a film in 1934, starring Grossmith, Yvonne Arnaud, Evelyn Laye, Max Miller and Cecil Parker.

Songs

Act 1
Take a Letter to the King – Baron Sigman, Marie and Girls 
Palace of Dreams – Princess Elaine of Novia, Officers and Girls
The Panic's On – Lulu and Girls 
I'll Be There – Wanda Navarro, Irving Huff and Rasch Ballet 
Trailing a Shooting Star – Princess Elaine and Captain Torrelli
Here Is a Sword – Captain Torrelli and Sailors 
I'll Be There (Reprise) – Wanda and Captain Torrelli 
One for All – Ivanoff and Revolutionists
I Love Love (Lyrics by Walter O'Keefe, Music by Robert Emmett Dolan) – Wanda, Officers and Girls 
You – Princess Elaine and Captain Torrelli

Act 2
A Wonderful Thing for the King – Christian II of Elyria, Lulu and Girls 
Not Old Enough To Be Old – Albert Chuff
I'll Be There (Reprise) – Wanda and Christian II
I'll Never Leave You – Princess Elaine and Captain Torrelli
You (Reprise) – Princess Elaine 
I'll Never Leave You (Reprise) – Princess Elaine and Captain Torrelli
Wings of the Morning – Rasch Ballet

Roles and original cast
Wanda Navarro – Jeanne Aubert 	 	
Colette – Irene Bostick
Ivanoff – Douglass Dumbrille 	
Marie – Betty Gallagher
Baron Sigman – Roy Gordon
Veronique – Yvonne Grey
Christian II of Elyria – George Grossmith, Jr.	
Captain Torrelli of the Cruiser Elyria – Robert Halliday
Albert Chuff – W. H. Berry
Princess Elaine of Novia – Evelyn Herbert
Attorney General – Paul Huber
Lulu – Dorothea James
Anastasia – Frances Markey
Second Lieutenant – Ernest McChesney
Irving Huff – Victor Moore 	
Marguerite – Wilma Roeloff
Aide de Camp to the King – Howard St. John

Critical response
The Time Magazine review noted "The fact that it has sparkle and distinction is almost entirely attributable to blithe, blonde, beauteous Jeanne Aubert.  As the Princess, Evelyn Herbert ... is luscious-looking, hits good rich notes but experiences difficulty in making the lyrics intelligible."

Steven Suskin wrote that the operetta "was not especially distinguished, though it contained one song hit – the snappy, interpolated 'I Love Love'".

References

External links

Pathe film of a scene from the operetta

Hungarian-language operettas
1926 operas
1926 musicals
Broadway musicals
Musicals by Arthur Schwartz